Don Wenceslao Ramírez de Villa-Urrutia, 1st Marquis of Villa-Urrutia (1850, in Havana – 1933, in Madrid) was a Spanish noble, politician and diplomat who served as Minister of State between 27 January and 23 June 1905, in a cabinet headed by Raimundo Fernández Villaverde during the reign of Alfonso XIII of Spain.

Ramírez was appointed a Senator for life in 1905 and served as the Spanish Ambassador to Italy. He also served as a plenipotentiary minister to Constantinople, Athens, and Brussels. He was awarded the crosses of the Order of Isabella the Catholic and the Order of Charles III for his service to Spain, and the Cross of Naval Merit for his military service.

Ramírez was a member of the Royal Academy of History and the Royal Spanish Academy.

He authored multiple historical books, including La conferencia de AIgeciras (The Conference of Algeciras) (1906), Relaciones de España e Inglaterra durante la Guerra de la Independencia (Spanish and English Relations during the War of Independence) (1911), Apuntes para la historia diplomática de España (Notes for the Diplomatic History of Spain) (1914), Las mujeres de Fernando VII (Women of Fernando VII) (1916), La reina María Luisa, esposa de Carlos IV (Queen Maria Luisa, wife of Carlos IV) (1927), Palique diplomático (1928), Madame de Staël (1930), Fernán-Núñez, el embajador (Fernán-Núñez, the ambassador) (1931); Fernando VII, rey constitucional, y Fernando VII, rey absoluto (Fernando VII, constitutional king, and Ferdinand VII, absolute king) (1931), and Lucrecia Borja, Le Reina Gobernadora (Lucrezia Borgia, the Ruling Queen).

|-

References 

Marquesses of Spain
Foreign ministers of Spain
1850 births
1933 deaths
Conservative Party (Spain) politicians
Ambassadors of Spain to Belgium
Ambassadors of Spain to Greece
Ambassadors of Spain to Turkey
Ambassadors of Spain to Austria
Ambassadors of Spain to France
Ambassadors of Spain to the United Kingdom of Great Britain and Ireland
Ambassadors of Spain to the Holy See
Spanish expatriates in Cuba
Honorary Knights Grand Cross of the Royal Victorian Order
Politicians awarded knighthoods